A by-election was held for the Australian House of Representatives electorate of Darling Downs in Queensland on 14 September 1901, a Saturday. It was triggered by the death of William Henry Groom on 8 August 1901. It was the first by-election of the Australian parliament since Federation. The writ for the by-election was issued on 13 August, nominations for candidates closed on 27 August.

Results

Aftermath
Littleton Groom was elected in the by-election, receiving nearly 63 per cent of the vote. Groom was the third son of the deceased former member, William Groom. The other candidate in the by-election was Joshua Thomas Bell, a member of the Legislative Assembly of Queensland for the electoral district of Dalby.

References

See also
List of Australian federal by-elections

1901 elections in Australia
Queensland federal by-elections
1900s in Queensland